Exes Baggage is a 2018 Filipino romantic drama film directed by Dan Villegas, starring Angelica Panganiban and Carlo Aquino. The film was produced by Black Sheep Productions as their theatrical debut and is distributed by ABS-CBN Films.

The film also marks as Aquino and Panganiban's long-awaited reunion movie.

Plot
The story begins two years after the break up between Pia (Angelica Panganiban) and Nix Cabangon (Carlo Aquino) and they were invited in the party made by the married couple Reyna (Dionne Monsanto) and Tops. It shows some flashbacks where Pia and Reyna gazed on Nix at the bar which leads Pia to begin their romantic relationship with Nix after they both explained their main problems about their exes and Nix's hospitality to her. As soon as Pia sees Migs (Joem Bascon) and his family at All Home, Nix became jealous which leads them to have a fall out with each other at their home and mentioned Nix's ex-girlfriend Dwein (Coleen Garcia). Nix soon apologizes to Pia for his rash behavior and mentioning his ex. As Dwein showed up with Tops for the furnitures she wanted for Nix, this causes Pia to get jealous, realizing that Nix still have feelings for her and she was the main reason why Pia had broke up with Nix.

Back at the present day, the two reintroduced themselves after their break up until Tops' announcement to have a second baby (calling Reyna as his first "baby") with Reyna as the band plays the song that Nix sang for Pia in their previous relationship. When both Pia and Nix almost kissed, it was revealed that Pia already has a boyfriend named Anton who called her to come home which causes Pia to leave the party. As Pia gets inside the car to drive home, Nix showed up to say goodbye to her while calling her car
"Ogie" (Pia named it in the beginning of the film). Pia refuses to call back Anton and decides to reconcile with Nix.

Cast
Angelica Panganiban as Pia
Carlo Aquino as Nix
Dionne Monsanto as Reyna
Joem Bascon as Migs (Pia's ex-boyfriend)
Coleen Garcia as Dwein (Nix's ex-girlfriend)

Release
The film released its one-minute teaser in the production company's Facebook page on August 4, 2018, and the video garnered almost 
2 million views. The second teaser was released via the production company's Facebook page on September 1, 2018, where the theatrical released date is also revealed, releasing the film theatrically on September 26, 2018.

Reception

Box office
Exes Baggage earned an estimated amount of ₱21.6 million on its first day of showing. As of October 5, 2018, the film earned ₱206,693,044.73 domestically.

The film earned a total of ₱355.50 million in domestic and international showings as of October 23, 2018.

References

External links
 

2018 films
Philippine romantic comedy films
2018 romantic comedy films